Baumkuchen is a kind of spit cake from German cuisine. It is also a popular dessert in Japan. The characteristic rings that appear in its slices resemble tree rings, and give the cake its German name, Baumkuchen, which literally translates to "tree cake" or "log cake".

History
It is disputed who made the first Baumkuchen and where it was first baked. One theory is that it was invented in the German town of Salzwedel, which is further popularized by the town itself. Another theory suggests it began as a Hungarian wedding cake. In Ein new Kochbuch (lit. "A New Cookbook"), the first cookbook written for professional chefs by Marx Rumpolt, there is a recipe for Baumkuchen. This publication puts the origin of Baumkuchen as far back at 1581, the year the cookbook was first published. Marx Rumpolt had previously worked as a chef in Hungary and Bohemia.

Characteristics

Traditionally, Baumkuchen is made on a spit by brushing on even layers of batter and then rotating the spit around a heat source. Each layer is allowed to brown before a new layer of batter is poured. When the cake is removed and sliced, each layer is divided from the next by a golden line, resembling the growth rings on a crosscut tree. A typical Baumkuchen is made up of 15 to 20 layers of batter. However, the layering process for making Baumkuchen can continue until the cakes are quite large.

Baumkuchen ingredients are typically butter, eggs, sugar, vanilla, salt, and flour. Baking powder is not considered a traditional ingredient. The ratio of flour, butter and eggs is typically 1:1:2 respectively (i.e., 100 grams of flour, 100 grams of butter and 200 grams of eggs). The recipe can be varied by adding other ingredients, such as ground nuts, honey, marzipan, nougat and rum or brandy, to the batter or filling. Additionally, Baumkuchen may be covered with sugar or chocolate glaze. With some recipes, the fully baked and cooled Baumkuchen is first coated with marmalade or jam, and then covered with chocolate.

Variations

Baumkuchenspitzen, German for "Tree Cake Points," are miniature versions of Baumkuchen that are created from the cake scraps that fall during the cake's creation on a spit. These pieces are typically coated in chocolate and sold separately.

A simpler horizontally layered version of the cake called a "Schichttorte" also exists. It is baked without a spit and thus does not have circular rings but horizontal layers. The horizontally layered version results in a Baumkuchen that is more similar in shape to conventional cakes. It can also be baked in a conventional household oven that has a broiler inside, whereas the traditional spit version requires special equipment normally not available in an average household. However, unlike with the spit variant, the Schichttorte cross section is less reminiscent of tree rings.

Baumkuchen in Japan
Baumkuchen is one of the most popular pastries in Japan, where it is called . It is a popular return present in Japan for wedding guests because of its ring shape.

It was first introduced to Japan by the German Karl Joseph Wilhelm Juchheim. Juchheim was in the Chinese city of Tsingtao during World War I, and when the war ended, the Japanese Army began invading China and moved him and his wife to Japan. Juchheim started making and selling the traditional confection at a German exhibition in Hiroshima in 1919. He might have baked Japans first Baumkuchen before the exhibition on Ninoshima. Continued success allowed him to move to Yokohama and open a bakery-store, but it was destroyed in the Great Kanto Earthquake of 1923, thus forcing him to move his operations to Kobe, where he stayed until the end of World War II. Some years later, his wife returned to help a Japanese company open a chain of bakeries under the Juchheim name that further helped spread Baumkuchen's popularity in Japan and is still in operation.

See also
 
 Layer cake

References 

Japanese desserts and sweets
German cakes
Spit cakes

fr:Gâteau à la broche